London Crawford (born October 19, 1986) is an American football wide receiver for the Columbus Lions of the National Arena League (NAL). He played college football at the University of Arkansas. He was signed as an undrafted free agent by the Houston Texans in 2010.

Early life
Crawford attended Davidson High School in Mobile, Alabama.

Personal life
Crawford had two young boys. One he lost May 17, 2014 at the age of three months to SIDS. It was telecast on the news that he played versus the Orlando Predators that same night that led him to two touchdowns in honor of his son.

Professional career

Houston Texans
After going undrafted in the 2010 NFL Draft, Crawford signed with the Houston Texans of the National Football League (NFL). He was cut by the Texans following the preseason.

Columbus Lions
In 2012, Crawford signed with the Columbus Lions of the Professional Indoor Football League (PIFL). Crawford was named the PIFL Offensive Rookie of the Year, as well as was named First Team All-PIFL after leading the league with 103 receptions and 1,044 receiving yards.

Jacksonville Sharks
Crawford was assigned to the Jacksonville Sharks of the Arena Football League (AFL) in 2013.

Monterrey Steel
On January 17, 2017, Crawford signed with the Monterrey Steel.

Massachusetts Pirates
On December 6, 2017, Crawford signed with the Massachusetts Pirates. Crawford was released on June 20, 2018.

Columbus Lions
Crawford signed with the Lions on June 27, 2018.

Mexico City Mexicah
On 2018, Crawford signed with the IAFL Mexico City Mexicah

References

External links
 Arkansas Razorbacks bio
 Jacksonville Sharks bio

1986 births
Living people
American football wide receivers
Arkansas Razorbacks football players
Columbus Lions players
Jacksonville Sharks players
Monterrey Steel players
Massachusetts Pirates players
Sportspeople from Mobile, Alabama
Players of American football from Alabama